Taiping District is a district of the city of Fuxin, Liaoning province, People's Republic of China.

Administrative divisions

There are five subdistricts and one town within the district.

Subdistricts:
Hongshu Subdistrict, Meihai Subdistrict, Gaode Subdistrict, Chengnan Subdistrict, Sunjiawan Subdistrict

The only town is Shuiquan

References

External links

County-level divisions of Liaoning